Kristina Moir (born 10 April 1951) is a Puerto Rican former swimmer. She competed in seven events at the 1968 Summer Olympics.

References

1951 births
Living people
Puerto Rican female swimmers
Olympic swimmers of Puerto Rico
Swimmers at the 1968 Summer Olympics
Sportspeople from Hawaii
Swimmers at the 1967 Pan American Games
Pan American Games medalists in swimming
Pan American Games bronze medalists for Puerto Rico
Central American and Caribbean Games gold medalists for Puerto Rico
Central American and Caribbean Games medalists in swimming
Competitors at the 1966 Central American and Caribbean Games
Medalists at the 1967 Pan American Games